Dusty Noble (born 30 April 1984) is a former South African rugby union footballer. His regular playing position is Wing. He represented the Cheetahs in Super Rugby and Griquas in the Currie Cup.

He left  after the 2013 and joined Durban-based club side College Rovers before the 2014 SARU Community Cup.

References

External links
 
 

Living people
1984 births
South African rugby union players
Cheetahs (rugby union) players
Griquas (rugby union) players
Sharks (Currie Cup) players
Sharks (rugby union) players
Golden Lions players
Lions (United Rugby Championship) players
People from Stellenbosch
Rugby union wings
South Africa international rugby sevens players